In mathematics, a seashell surface is a surface made by a circle which spirals up the z-axis while decreasing its own radius and distance from the z-axis.  Not all seashell surfaces describe actual seashells found in nature.

Parametrization
The following is a parameterization of one seashell surface:

where  and \\

Various authors have suggested different models for the shape of shell. David M. Raup proposed a model where there is one magnification for the x-y plane, and another for the x-z plane. Chris Illert proposed a model where the magnification is scalar, and the same for any sense or direction with an equation like

which starts with an initial generating curve  and applies a rotation and exponential magnification.

See also
Helix
Seashell
Spiral

References

 
 C. Illert (Feb. 1983), "the mathematics of Gnomonic seashells", Mathematical Biosciences 63(1): 21-56.
 C. Illert (1987), "Part 1, seashell geometry", Il Nuovo Cimento 9D(7): 702-813.
 C. Illert (1989), "Part 2, tubular 3D seashell surfaces", Il Nuovo Cimento 11D(5): 761-780.
 C. Illert (Oct 1990),"Nipponites mirabilis, a challenge to seashell theory?", Il Nuovo Cimento 12D(10): 1405-1421.
 C. Illert (Dec 1990), "elastic conoidal spires", Il Nuovo Cimento 12D(12): 1611-1632.
 C. Illert & C. Pickover (May 1992), "generating irregularly oscillating fossil seashells", IEE Computer Graphics & Applications 12(3):18-22.
 C. Illert (July 1995), "Australian supercomputer graphics exhibition", IEEE Computer Graphics & Applications 15(4):89-91.
 C. Illert (Editor 1995), "Proceedings of the First International Conchology Conference, 2-7 Jan 1995, Tweed Shire, Australia", publ. by Hadronic Press, Florida USA. 219 pages.
 C. Illert & R. Santilli (1995), "Foundations of Theoretical Conchology", publ. by Hadronic Press, Florida USA. 183 pages plus coloured plates.
 Deborah R. Fowler, Hans Meinhardt, and Przemyslaw Prusinkiewicz. Modeling seashells. Proceedings of SIGGRAPH '92 (Chicago, Illinois, July 26–31, 1992), In Computer Graphics, 26, 2, (July 1992), ACM SIGGRAPH, New York, pp. 379–387.
 Callum Galbraith, Przemyslaw Prusinkiewicz, and Brian Wyvill. Modeling a Murex cabritii sea shell with a structured implicit surface modeler. The Visual Computer vol. 18, pp. 70–80. http://algorithmicbotany.org/papers/murex.tvc2002.html

Surfaces